Corriher may refer to:

Corriher Grange Hall, a building near Enochville, Rowan County, North Carolina, US
Shirley Corriher (born 1935), American biochemist and author